Ficadusta pulchella is a species of sea snail, a cowry, a marine gastropod mollusk in the family Cypraeidae, the cowries.

Subspecies
 Ficadusta pulchella aliguayensis (van Heesvelde & Deprez, 2002)
 Ficadusta pulchella novaebritanniae (F. A. Schilder & M. Schilder, 1937)
 Ficadusta pulchella pericalles (Melvill & Standen, 1904)

Description

Distribution

References

 Orr J. (1985). Hong Kong seashells. The Urban Council, Hong Kong
 Heesvelde van, J. & Deprez, J., 2002. A new subspecies of Erronea pulchella Swainson, 1823 (Mollusca: Gastropoda: Cypraeidae). La Conchiglia 301: 41–47

External links

Cypraeidae
Gastropods described in 1823